

Silent films

Sound films

References 

Lists of lost films